Old Ironsides is a 1982 video game published by Xerox Educational Publications.

Gameplay
Old Ironsides is a game in which two players fight each other using ships armed with six guns on each side.

Reception
Computer Gaming World reviewed the game and stated that "Old Ironsides (OI) is an excellent example of a game that combines graphic/arcade features with strategic planning."

Reviews
Electronic Fun with Computers & Games - Aug, 1983

References

External links
Review in Computers & Electronics
Review in Creative Computing
Review in Softalk
Review in Videogaming Illustrated
Review in Micro7 (French)
Review in Weekly Reader Family Software

1982 video games
Apple II games
Apple II-only games
Ship simulation games
Video games developed in the United States
Video games set in the 19th century